Australia was represented by two athletes in the first Paralympic badminton competition at the  2020 Tokyo Paralympics.

Medal Tally

Summer Paralympic Games

2020 Tokyo 

Australia was represented by:

Women -  Caitlin Dransfield 
Men - Grant Manzoney 
Officials - Team Manager - Ian Bridge  

Detailed Australian Results

References 

Australian Paralympic teams
Badminton in Australia